Quercus hondae is a species of tree in the beech family Fagaceae. It has been found on Kyushu Island in southern Japan. It is placed in subgenus Cerris, section Cyclobalanopsis.

Quercus hondae is an evergreen tree with dark gray bark. Twigs are dark brown and hairless. Leaves can be as much as 14 cm long, thick and leathery.

References

External links

hondae
Trees of Japan
Plants described in 1902